Jean Engler is a retired Swiss slalom canoeist who competed in the 1940s and the 1950s. He won four medals at the ICF Canoe Slalom World Championships with two golds (C-2: 1953, Folding K-1 team: 1949), a silver (C-2 team: 1953) and a bronze (Folding K-1 team: 1951).

References

Possibly living people
Swiss male canoeists
Year of birth missing (living people)
Medalists at the ICF Canoe Slalom World Championships